American Tobacco Co. v. Werckmeister, 207 U.S. 284 (1907), was a United States Supreme Court case in which the Court held the seizure by the United States marshal in a copyright case of certain pictures under a writ of replevin did not constitute an unreasonable search and seizure.

References

External links
 

American Tobacco Companyc
1907 in United States case law
United States Supreme Court cases
United States Supreme Court cases of the Fuller Court
United States copyright case law